Colonel John Okey (24 August 1606 – 19 April 1662) was a political and religious radical who served in the Parliamentarian army during the Wars of the Three Kingdoms. A regicide who approved the Execution of Charles I in 1649, he escaped to the Dutch Republic after the 1660 Stuart Restoration, but was brought back to England and executed on 19 April 1662.

Personal details
John Okey was baptised at St Giles-in-the-Fields in London on 24 August 1606, sixth child of William Okey and his wife, Margaret Whetherly. Okey came from a prominent family which had property in London as well as a coat of arms.

On  21 January 1630, John Okey married Susanna Pearson. Okey became a proprietor of a ships' chandler's business by 1640. Okey's first wife, Susanna, died and he later remarried to Mary Blackwell in 1658.

Before the start of the Civil War, Okey worked as a stoker at a brewery. When the Civil War began, he enlisted in the Parliamentary army of the Earl of Essex as a quartermaster, and became one of the "humble" men who advanced to positions of higher rank and position. Okey quickly advanced in rank becoming a captain of horse, and later became a Major in a regiment commanded by Arthur Hesilrige. When the New Model Army was formed in 1645, John Okey was appointed colonel of a regiment of Dragoons, a form of mounted infantry troopers capable of quickly advancing, attacking, and then withdrawing from an engagement. Okey's regiment gained lasting fame for their actions at the Battle of Naseby, where his dragoons opened the fighting by firing into the right wing of the Royalist horse from a concealed position in Sulby Hedges, and later delivered probably the first mounted charge by English dragoons. Later the same year, Okey's regiment saved John Butler's cavalry regiment when they were extremely close to being defeated by Prince Rupert's cavalry. Okey also fought at Boroughbridge and at Bath in Somerset. Okey was captured by the Royalists at the siege of Bristol, but was released after the city surrendered.

An upsurge of political activism began after the victory in the first civil war. Okey's regiment was not noticeably radical. Increased political activism did, however, give rise to agitation in June 1647. In December 1647, a loyal address was presented to the commander of the New Model Army, Thomas Fairfax, by many of the troops. Okey's regiment later served in the second civil war in South Wales in 1648. The same year, Okey also brought his regiment to fight in the battle of St Fagans as well as at the siege of Pembroke Castle.

Involvement in the trial and execution of Charles I
In 1648, Okey was appointed a commissioner to the High Court of Justice after the king was declared as having "traitorously and maliciously levyed war against the present parliament and the people therein represented" and set to stand trial. Okey was one of 135 men who were selected and appointed by "An Act of the Commons Assembled in Parliament". Okey, along with about 80 others (all of whom were at risk of being labelled as regicides), was actively involved in the case and was present for most of the court's sittings. Moreover, Okey was one of 59 who signed the king's death warrant, and was also charged with upholding the validity of the actions surrounding the execution of Charles I.

Religious radicalism
John Okey was considered a religious radical, and practised as both a Baptist and a Congregationalist. This outlook affected his military career, and he wrote following his own involvement in the battle of Naseby that the parliamentarians:
"...should magnifie the name of our God that did remember a poore handfull of dispised men, whom they had thought to have swallowed up before them."
In February 1652, after Okey's return to England following a military excursion in Scotland, Okey filed a petition to parliament regarding a number of religious reforms as a means of spreading the Gospel and reforming what he considered to be a flawed parochial ministry. There is also some evidence to suggest that Okey was involved in the creation of John Bunyan's Baptist church in Bedford in 1653.

Following his prosecution as a regicide, Okey was quoted as stating that his actions and strong commitment to Congregationalism was "for righteousness and for justice and for the advancement of a godly magistracy and a godly ministry".

Petition of the three colonels
In 1654, Okey signed the petition of the three colonels, drafted by the Leveller and republican John Wildman, along with colonels Thomas Saunders, and Matthew Alured which criticised Oliver Cromwell and the Protectorate. It was unsuccessful and although only Alured was imprisoned, all three were cashiered from the New Model Army.
Okey retired to Bedfordshire, where he had invested heavily in land, and was elected MP for Bedfordshire in the Third Protectorate Parliament of 1659.

Arrest and execution
As part of the political compromise that allowed for the restoration of the monarchy at the end of the interregnum, Parliament passed the Act of Free and General Pardon, Indemnity, and Oblivion. Under this act most people were granted a general pardon for any crimes that they had committed during the civil war and during the interregnum. However two score of people were exempted from this pardon. The exceptions of certain crimes such as murder (without a licence granted by King or Parliament), piracy, buggery, rape and witchcraft, and people named in the act such as those involved in the regicide of Charles I.

Some of those who had reason to believe that they would not be included in the general pardon, fled abroad in an attempt to escape royalist retribution. Okey, with John Barkstead, went to Germany. In fleeing abroad, he forfeited the right to a trial for his alleged crimes and was declared an outlaw.

In 1662, however, while in the Netherlands, Okey was arrested along with Barkstead and Miles Corbet by Sir George Downing, the English ambassador to the Dutch court. The three prisoners were immediately sent to England, and, as they had been previously outlawed, their trial turned entirely on the question of identity.

Okey and his companions were executed at Tower Hill on 19 April 1662; although condemned to be hanged, drawn and quartered, they were left hanging for more than 20 minutes and thus were almost certainly dead before being quartered. Permission had been granted for Okey to be buried by his family in Stepney next to his first wife, but a large crowd had gathered to pay their respects and he was interred within the Tower of London.

References

Sources
       
 
 

1606 births
1662 deaths
English MPs 1659
Executed regicides of Charles I
People executed by Stuart England by hanging, drawing and quartering
Executed people from London
English Baptists
English Congregationalists
17th-century Baptists
English politicians convicted of crimes
Parliamentarian military personnel of the English Civil War